Schodack Center is a hamlet in the town of Schodack, Rensselaer County, New York, United States. Schodack Center is at the junction of Interstate 90, U.S. Route 20 and U.S. Route 9.

References

Hamlets in Rensselaer County, New York
Hamlets in New York (state)